Goodrich Independent School District is a public school district based in Goodrich, Texas (USA) that serves students in south central Polk County.

Schools
The district has three schools - All 3 schools and the administration building are located on the same "campus".  The middle school and elementary school are in the same building.
Goodrich High School (Grades 9-12), 
Goodrich Middle (Grades 6-8) 
Goodrich Elementary (Grades PK-5)

In 2009, the school district was rated "academically acceptable" by the Texas Education Agency.

References

External links
Goodrich ISD

School districts in Polk County, Texas